Ignace Nazaire Oswald Pilloud (27 July 1873 – 6 July 1946) was a Swiss painter and illustrator .

Biography 
Born in Châtel-Saint-Denis in 1873, Pilloud attended Ferdinand Hodler's classes in Fribourg from 1896 to 1899 where he studied together with Raymond Buchs, Hiram Brülhart and Jean-Edouard de Castella. Encouraged by Hodler to pursue his career as a painter, he travelled to Paris where he studied at the Académie de la Grande Chaumière, as well as the Académie Colarossi, and was influenced by les Nabis.

Having returned to Switzerland in 1905 he worked as a drawing teacher at the Technicum in Fribourg and had in particular Armand Niquille amongst his students. Two years later he joined the Fribourg section of the Swiss Society of Painters, Sculptors and Architects. Even if he painted a few still lifes and portraits, Oswald Pilloud remains famous for his landscapes inspired by Ferdinand Hodler.

Pilloud died in 1946 in Fribourg.

Works in public institutions 
 Alpes fribourgeoises, vers 1917. Musée gruérien, Bulle
 La Veveyse, s.d.. Musée d’Art et d’Histoire, Fribourg

References
 Paysagistes fribourgeois, Musée d'art et d'histoire, Fribourg, 1972
 Hodler und Freiburg. Die Mission des Künstlers. Hodler et Fribourg. La Mission de l'artiste, Ausstellung-Katalog, Musée d'Art et d'Histoire, Fribourg, 1981
 La tête des nôtres : portraits à Fribourg, 1850-2000, exhibition catalogue, Musée d'Art et d'Histoire de Fribourg, Fribourg, 2004 
 Ph. Clerc, Un carrefour artistique, in: La Gruyère dans le miroir de son patrimoine, Une région en représentation, t.5, Editions Alphil, 2011, p. 14
 Th. Guisan, « Pilloud, pinceau châtelois », La Gruyère, 8 juin 2013, p. 20
 M. Durussel, « Le trop méconnu Oswald Pilloud », La Liberté, 24 août 2013, p. 30

External links 
 (fr) 
 

19th-century Swiss painters
Swiss male painters
20th-century Swiss painters
1873 births
1946 deaths
Modern painters
Académie Colarossi alumni
People from Fribourg
19th-century Swiss male artists
20th-century Swiss male artists